Palo Hincado Site, also known as BA-1, is an archeological site in or near Barranquitas, Puerto Rico. Reportedly a number of petroglyphs on stones around the plaza and ball court) have been removed by collectors.

The site was visited by archeologist Irving Rouse in 1936.

It was listed on the National Register of Historic Places in 1999.

Palo Hincado is also the name of a barrio, a neighborhood, of Barranquitas.

See also

National Register of Historic Places listings in central Puerto Rico

References

Archaeological sites on the National Register of Historic Places in Puerto Rico
Barranquitas, Puerto Rico
Native American history of Puerto Rico
Pre-Columbian archaeological sites
Petroglyphs in Puerto Rico